Alexander James Edward Cave  (13 September 1900 – 17 May 2001) was a British anatomist.

Cave was born in Manchester and received his education at Manchester High School. He attended Manchester University to study medicine, graduating in 1923.

Cave was Senior Demonstrator and Lecturer in Anatomy at the University of Leeds until 1933, when he became the Curator of the Anatomical Museum at University College in London. He also became Arnott Demonstrator and Professor of Human and Comparative Anatomy at the Royal College of Surgeons. For more than two decades, he was Professor of Anatomy at St Bartholomew's Hospital. He was also Examiner in Anatomy for London University, Cambridge University, and the Royal University of Malta. Elected to the Royal College of Surgeons as a Fellow in 1959, Cave was also granted lifetime membership to the Anatomical Society.

He served as president of the Linnean Society from 1970 to 1973. He was a staunch Roman Catholic and got involved in several attempts to authenticate church relics.

He died in London in 2001. He had married twice: firstly in 1926 to Dorothy Dimbleby (they had one daughter) and secondly in 1970 to Catherine FitzGerald.

He and William L. Straus are known for having published jointly during 1957 the remark concerning Neanderthal people that:
"If he could be reincarnated and placed in a New York subway— provided that he were bathed, shaved, and dressed in modern clothing— it is doubtful whether he would attract any more attention than some of its other denizens."

References

1900 births
2001 deaths
Alumni of the University of Manchester
British anatomists
British centenarians
British Roman Catholics
Fellows of the Royal College of Surgeons
Fellows of the Linnean Society of London
Academics of the University of Leeds
People associated with University College London
Men centenarians